The Argon Neutrino Teststand (ArgoNeuT) detector, is a liquid argon neutrino detector at the Fermi National Accelerator Laboratory (Fermilab). The results of the experiment may aid in understanding the nature of neutrinos. This experiment is the precursor to the MicroBooNE experiment. Researchers finished collecting data from ArgoNeuT in March 2010, however analysis is still underway.

See also
 Fermilab
 MicroBooNE

References

External links
 ArgoNeut Homepage
 Record for ArgoNeuT on INSPIRE-HEP 

Neutrino observatories
Particle experiments
Fermilab experiments
Accelerator neutrino experiments